The Ministry of Economy and Planning (MEP) is one of the governmental bodies of Saudi Arabia and part of the cabinet. The ministry has the function of developing and implementing five-year plans which reflect the long-term economical targets of the country.

History
The ministry of economy and planning was established in 1953. However, the body was not functional and was disestablished in 1954.

The ministry of economy and planning was formed in 2003 when the ministry of planning and economy department were merged. Until 2003 the ministry of economy and planning was in charge of development and implementation of five-year plans. The ministry is based in Riyadh.

Since its foundation in 2003, the ministry has been headed by three ministers. The first minister was Khalid bin Mohammed Al Gosaibi who was appointed to the post in April 2003. Mohammad Al Jasser was the minister of economy and planning from December 2011 to April 2015.  Adel Fakeih was appointed the minister of economy and planning in April 2015. The current minister is Faisal F. Alibrahim who was appointed as acting minister on 6 March 2020 replacing Mohammed Al-Jadaan.

Functions
The major function of the ministry is to prepare the development plans of the country. It has various major agencies including the central department of statistics and the national computer center.

References

2003 establishments in Saudi Arabia
Saudi Arabia, Economy and Planning
Economy of Saudi Arabia
Economy
Saudi Arabia
Saudi Arabia